William Brown Foley (November 15, 1855 – November 12, 1916) was a Major League Baseball third baseman. He played all or part of seven seasons in the majors, playing for five different teams in three different leagues. From  until , he was the starting third baseman for the Cincinnati Reds and Milwaukee Grays.

Sources

Major League Baseball third basemen
Chicago White Stockings players
Cincinnati Reds (1876–1879) players
Milwaukee Grays players
Detroit Wolverines players
Chicago Browns/Pittsburgh Stogies players
St. Paul Apostles players
Minneapolis Millers (baseball) players
Lincoln Tree Planters players
19th-century baseball players
1855 births
1916 deaths
Baseball players from Chicago